This is a list of Mobile Device Management software.

General information

Discontinued
These are the discontinued Mobile Device Management solutions:
 Good Technology - acquired by BlackBerry on November 2, 2015.
 McAfee EMM - discontinued since January 11, 2017.
 Parallels MDM - sales ended on August 31, 2016 but the support is extended up to August 31, 2017.
 SAP Afaria MDM - sales ended on August 31, 2016 but the support is extended up to August 31, 2017.
 Symantec Mobile Management - End-of-life since October 6, 2014. Partial support extended up to March 1, 2017.

References

Mobile device management
Mobile Device Management